The Battle of the Allia was a battle fought  between the Senones – a Gallic tribe led by Brennus, who had invaded Northern Italy – and the Roman Republic. The battle was fought at the confluence of the Tiber and Allia rivers, 11 Roman miles (16 km, 10 mi) north of Rome. The Romans were routed and subsequently Rome was sacked by the Senones. According to scholar Piero Treves, "the absence of any archaeological evidence for a destruction-level of this date suggests that [this] sack of Rome was superficial only."

The date of the battle has been traditionally given as 390 BC in the Varronian chronology, based on an account of the battle by the Roman historian Livy. Plutarch noted that the battle took place "just after the summer solstice when the moon was near the full [...] a little more than three hundred and sixty years from the founding [of Rome]," or shortly after 393 BC. The Greek historian Polybius used a Greek dating system to derive the year as having taken place in 387 BC, which is the most probable. Tacitus listed the date as 18 July.

Background
The Senones were one of the various Gallic tribes that had recently invaded northern Italy. They settled on the Adriatic Coast around what is now Rimini. According to Livy, they were called to the Etruscan town of Clusium (now Chiusi, Tuscany) by Aruns, an influential young man of the city who wanted to take revenge against Lucumo, whose son had "debauched his wife." When the Senones appeared, the Clusians felt threatened and asked Rome for help. The Romans sent the three sons of Marcus Fabius Ambustus, one of Rome's most powerful aristocrats, as ambassadors. They told the Gauls not to attack Clusium and that if they did, the Romans would fight to defend the town. They then asked to negotiate peace. The Senones accepted peace if the Clusians would give them some land. There was a quarrel and a battle broke out. The Roman ambassadors joined in. One of them killed a Senone chieftain. That was a violation of the rule that ambassadors had to be neutral. The brothers had taken sides and one of them had also killed a Senone. The Gauls withdrew to discuss what action to take.

According to Dionysius of Halicarnassus, Lucumo was the king of the city. He assigned the guardianship of his son to Aruns before he died. When the son became a young man, he fell in love with the wife of Aruns and seduced her. The grieving Aruns went to Gaul to sell wine, olives, and figs. The Gauls had never seen such products and asked Aruns where they were produced. He replied that they came from a large and fertile land, inhabited by only a few people who were not good fighters. He advised them to drive the people out of their land and enjoy the fruit as their own. He persuaded them to come to Italy, go to Clusium, and make war. Dionysius' account presumes that those Gauls had not invaded Italy and were in Gaul. When Quintus Fabius, one of the Roman ambassadors, killed a Gallic leader, they wanted the brothers to be handed over to them to pay the penalty for the men they had killed.

When the ambassadors of the Senones arrived in Rome and demanded the three Fabii brothers be handed over to them, the Senate was pressured by favouritism not to express opinions against the powerful Fabia family. To avoid being blamed for a possible defeat if the Gauls attacked, they referred the matter to the people. Livy wrote that "those whose punishment they were asked to decide were elected military tribunes with consular powers [heads of state] for the coming year." The Gauls were enraged that those who had violated the law of nations had been honoured and marched on Rome, 130  km (81  mi) from Clusium. Livy wrote that "in response to the tumult caused by their swift advance, terrified cities rushed to arms and the country folk fled, but the Gauls signified by their shouts wherever they went that their destination was Rome."

Size of belligerent forces

The number of fighters involved in the battle is not known for sure. Plutarch writes that the Romans were not outnumbered and had 40,000 men but that most were untrained and unaccustomed to weapons. Dionysius of Halicarnassus writes that the Romans had four well-trained legions and a levy of untrained citizens that was larger in number. That would give a rough figure of some 35,000. Diodorus Siculus writes that the Romans had 24,000 men. Livy gives no figures. The modern historians Cary and Scullard estimate that the Romans had 15,000 men and the Gauls 30,000 to 70,000. Peter Berresford Ellis gives an estimate of a minimum of 24,000 based on the assumption that "the Romans had... four legions – for each consul had two legions under his command – and given that each legion had 6,000 men". He also thinks that there may have been a contingent of allied troops. He thinks that the "Senones' tribal army could scarcely number more than 12,000".

The figures given by ancient historians for the size of the Roman army engaged in the battle are unlikely since they are notorious for exaggerating figures. Contrary to Berresford Ellis's assertion, the Romans then had only two legions. The number of legions was not increased to four until later in the century, during the Second Samnite War (326-304 BC), and the first record of four legions occurred in 311 BC. The Romans then also had additional military commanders: the praetor, who had been instituted in 366 BC, and the proconsul, who was a consul who received an extension of his term of military command (the practice started in 327 BC). The first historical hints of the consuls leading more than one legion were for 299 BC (during a war with the Etruscans) and 297 BC, during the Third Samnite War (298-290 BC). The first explicit mention of a consul with two legions is in 296 BC. In 295 BC, the Romans deployed six legions; four led by the two consuls, and fought a coalition of four peoples (the Samnites, Etruscans, Umbrians and Senone Gauls) in the huge Battle of Sentinum. Two were led to another front by a praetor. The battle of the Allia took place in the early days of Rome when the Roman army was much smaller and its command structure was much simpler. The Roman army had only two legions, and the two consuls were the sole military commanders, each heading one legion. In addition, the battle occurred in the early history of the Roman Republic, while the consulship alternated with years in which Rome was headed by military tribunes with consular power, often referred to as consular tribunes instead, and 390 BC was a year in which six consular tribunes were in charge. Therefore, Berresford Ellis's assertion that the Romans at the battle of Allia had four legions, two for each of the two consuls, is doubly anachronistic. Moreover, the Roman legions had 6,000 men on only a few exceptional occasions. In the early days of the Republic, when the Battle of the Allia took place, it was 4,200. Later, it was 5,200 when at full strength, which was often not the case. Accordingly, the Roman force at the battle was likely substantially smaller than estimated.

The size of the population of Rome also needs to be considered. In its early days, Rome was still a city-state of only regional significance, and its territory did not stretch beyond 50  km (30  mi) from the city. Cornell notes that the estimates of the population of Rome in the late 6th century BC, based on the size of its territory range between 25,000 and 50,000, and thinks that the more likely figure is 25,000-40,000. The seminal work by Fraccaro gives a pool of military manpower of 9,000 men of military age (aged between 17 and 47), which would require a minimum population of 30,000.

Archaeological evidence shows that in the 5th century BC, there was an economic downturn that would have precluded considerable population growth. The territory of Rome had increased by 75% by the early 4th century, but the bulk of the increase was caused by the recent conquest of the city of Veii and its territory, and its population did not have Roman citizenship, a requirement to serve in the Roman army. Such considerations make it unlikely that the size of the population of Roman citizens would have been large enough to provide a military pool of 24,000 or more soldiers at the time of the Battle of the Allia.

In addition to the above factors that give further reasons to doubt the figures given about the size of the Roman forces at the Battle of the Allia, it has to be noted that the Romans did not have much time to prepare for the battle properly since after their embassy was rebuffed by the Romans, the Gauls immediately marched on Rome, only a few days’ marches away. The Roman army was then a part-time militia of peasant farmers levied for the military campaigning season and then returning to their farms. Not all men of military age were drafted every year. Some of the soldiers would have lived some distance from Rome and so needed time to walk there, the main means of travel for peasants.

The size of the Senone force should not be overestimated, either. The estimate given by Cary and Scullard of 30,000-70,000 (see above) is highly unlikely. Berresford Ellis rightly points out that his figure of 12,000 would have been quite large for a single tribe.

The Roman army was led by the tribune Quintus Sulpicius Longus.

Battle

There are only two ancient accounts that provide details of the battle. One is by Livy, and the other is by Diodorus Siculus.

According to Livy, no special measures were taken in Rome, and the levy "was not larger than had been usual in ordinary campaigns." The Gauls marched on Rome so quickly that "Rome was thunderstruck by the swiftness at which they moved, which is shown both by the haste in mustering the army as if it were meeting a spur-of-the-moment emergency and the difficulty in getting any further than the eleventh milestone." The Romans presumably were outnumbered. They did not set up camp or build a defensive rampart and they did not divine the gods, as they were supposed to. They extended the wings to avoid being outflanked, but that made their line so thin and weakened that the centre could hardly be kept together. They placed the reserves on a hill on the right. Brennus, the Senone chieftain, suspected that to be a ruse and that the reservists would attack him from the rear while he was fighting the Roman army in the plain. He, therefore, attacked the hill.

The Romans panicked. The left-wing threw their arms down and fled to the bank of the River Tiber. The Gauls killed the soldiers who were blocking one another's path in the disorderly flight. Those who could not swim or were weak were weighed down by their armour and drowned. Still, the majority of these men reached Veii, an Etruscan city that had recently been conquered by Rome and was near the other bank. They did not even send a messenger to warn Rome. The right-wing, further from the river and closer to the hill, fled to Rome. The Gauls were surprised at how easy their victory had been.

The ancient Greek historian Diodorus Siculus said the Romans marched and crossed the River Tiber. He is the only ancient historian who placed the battle on the right bank of the river. The Romans lined up their best troops, 24,000 men, in the plain and placed the weakest troops on the hill. The Celts also lined up, placed their best men on the hill, and easily won the clash. The bulk of the Roman soldiers in the plain fled to the river in a disorderly manner and impeded each other. The Celts killed the men in the rear. Some Romans tried to cross the river wearing their armour, which, according to Diodorus, they prized more than their lives, but that weighed them down. Some drowned and some managed to reach the bank further downstream with great effort. As the Gauls kept killing the Romans, the soldiers then threw their arms away and swam across the river. The Gauls threw javelins at them. Most of the survivors fled to the city of Veii. Some returned to Rome and reported that the army had been destroyed.

Plutarch wrote that the Gauls encamped near the confluence of the Allia with the Tiber, some 18  km (11  mi) from Rome, and attacked the Romans suddenly. There was a "disorderly and shameful battle." The Roman left wing was pushed into the river and destroyed while the right-wing withdrew before the Gauls' attack from the plain to the hills and most of them fled to Rome. The rest of the survivors escaped to Veii at night. "They thought that Rome was lost and all her people slain."

Sack

Account of Livy
Livy provides a detailed account of the sack of Rome. The Gauls were dumbfounded by their sudden and extraordinary victory and did not move from the place of the battle, as if they were puzzled. They feared a surprise and despoiled the dead, as was customary for them. When they did not see any hostile action, they set off and reached Rome before sunset. They saw that the city gates were open and that the walls were unmanned. That was another surprise. They decided to avoid a night battle in an unknown town and encamped between Rome and the River Anio. The inhabitants of Rome were in panic and did not know that most of their soldiers had fled to Veii, instead of Rome, and thought that the only survivors were those who fled back to Rome and that they had only a tiny force. Realising that they were defenceless, they decided to send the men of military age, the able-bodied senators and their families to the Capitoline Hill with weapons and provisions to defend the fortress. The Flamen of Quirinus and the Vestal Virgins, who were priests, were to take "the sacred things of the State" away and continue to perform their sacred cults. The situation was so dire that the elderly were left behind in the city and former consuls stayed with them to reconcile them with their fate. However, many of them followed their sons to the Capitoline. No one had the heart to stop them. Many people fled to the Janiculum Hill just outside the city and then dispersed to the countryside and other towns. The Flamen of Quirinus and the Vestal Virgins could take only some of the sacred objects and decided to bury the rest under the chapel next to the Flamen's house. They set off to the Janiculum with what they could carry. Lucius Albinus, who was leaving the city on a wagon, saw them walking. He ordered his wife and children to get off and gave them and the sacred vessels of Rome a lift to Caere, an Etruscan city on the coast that was an ally of Rome.

Those who had been officers of state decided to meet their fate wearing their ceremonial dresses and "the insignia of their former rank and honour and distinctions". They sat on their ivory chairs in front of their houses. The next day, the Senones entered the city. They passed through the open Colline Gate and went to the Roman Forum. They left a small body to guard there against any attack from the Capitoline and went through the streets for plunder. They did not meet anybody. People moved to other houses. The Gauls returned to the area of the Forum. Livy memorably described Gauls' encounter with the elderly patricians:

Despite the above statement, Livy wrote that the fires were not as widespread as one could expect on the first day of the capture of a city and speculated that the Gauls wanted not to destroy the city but only to intimidate the men on the Capitoline Hill into surrender to save their homes. Despite the anguish at hearing "the shouts of the enemy, the shrieks of the women and boys, the roar of the flames, and the crash of houses falling in", the men were resolved to continue to defend the hill. As that continued day after day, "they became as it was hardened to misery". After a few days, seeing that even though nothing survived "amidst the ashes and ruin" of the city, there was no sign of surrender, the Senones attacked Capitoline Hill at dawn. The defenders let the enemy climb up the steep hill and flung them down the slope. The Gauls stopped halfway up the hill. The Romans charged and inflicted such high casualties that the enemy never tried to take the hill again.

Instead, they prepared a siege. They divided their forces into two. One division besieged the hill, and the other went foraging in the territories of the neighbouring cities because all the grain around Rome had been taken to Veii by the Roman soldiers who had fled there. Some Gauls arrived at Ardea, where Marcus Furius Camillus, a great Roman military commander who had seized Veii a few years earlier, had gone when he was exiled because of accusations of embezzlement. Camillus rallied the people of Ardea to fight. He marched at night, caught the camp of the Gauls by surprise, and massacred the enemy in their sleep. Some Gallic fugitives got near Antium and were surrounded by its townsmen.

Meanwhile, in Rome, both sides were quiet. The Senones conducted the siege "with great slackness" and concentrated on preventing the Romans from slipping through their lines. The patrician clan of the Fabii held an annual sacrifice on the Quirinal Hill. Gaius Fabius Dorsuo came down the Capitoline carrying the sacred vessels, passed through the enemy pickets and went to the Quirinal. He duly performed the sacred rites and returned the Capitoline. Livy commented, "Either the Gauls were stupefied at his extraordinary boldness, or else they were restrained by religious feelings, for as a nation they are by no means inattentive to the claims of religion".

In the meantime, the survivors of the battle who had fled to Veii began to regroup. Led by Quintus Caedicius, the centurion they chose as their leader, they routed a force of Etruscans who looted the territory of Veii and intended to attack this city. They made some prisoners lead them to another Etruscan force, which was at the salt works, and inflicted even greater losses on that force. Caedicius' forces grew, and some Romans who had fled the city went to Veii. Volunteers from Latium also joined them. Caedicius decided to summon Camillus to take the command, but that required approval of the Senate. They sent Cominius Pontius, a soldier, to Rome as a messenger. He went down the River Tiber on a cork float and reached Rome. He reached the Capitoline by scaling "a precipitous rock which, owing to its steepness, the enemy had left unguarded". The Senate decreed that the popular assembly was to pass a law that annulled the banishment of Camillus and appointed him dictator (commander-in-chief). Camillus was escorted from Ardea to Veii.

The Senones either found footprints left by Cominius Pontius or discovered a relatively-easy ascent up the cliff. They climbed it and reached the summit of the Capitoline at night. They were heard not by the guards and the dogs but by the geese sacred to the goddess Juno, which woke up the Romans. Marcus Manlius Capitolinus, a former consul, knocked down a Gaul who had reached the top. He fell on those behind him. Manlius also killed some Gauls who had laid aside their weapons to cling to the rocks. He was joined by the other soldiers and the enemy was repulsed. Manlius was commended for his bravery. Quintus Sulpicius wanted to court-martial the guards who had failed to notice the enemy, but the soldiers prevented him from doing so. It was agreed to blame one man, who was thrown down the cliff.

Famine began to afflict both armies. The Gauls were also affected by pestilence. They were on low ground between the hills, which had been scorched by the fires and there was malaria. Many of them died because of disease and the heat. They started to pile the dead bodies and burn them, instead of burying them, started negotiations with the Romans and called on them to surrender because of the famine. They also hinted that they could be bought off. The Roman leaders, who were waiting for Camillus to arrive with an army from Veii, refused. Eventually, the starving soldiers called for surrender or an agreement on a ransom on the best terms that they could. Quintus Sulpicius and Brennus, the leader of the Senones, held talks. They agreed on a ransom of a thousand pounds of gold. The Senones cheated, using heavier weights to weigh the gold. When the Romans protested, 'Brennus tossed his sword on the scale, uttering words intolerable to the Roman ears, namely 'Vae victis,' or ‘Woe to the vanquished!'"

Paying off the Senones to leave the city was a humiliation for the Romans. However, as Livy put it, "god and man forbade the Romans to be a ransomed people". Before the weighing of the gold had been completed, Camillus reached Rome and ordered the gold not to be taken away. The Gauls said that an agreement had been made, but Camillus said that since it had been struck by an official of lesser status than he was, it was invalid. Camillus then offered battle, and the Senones were easily defeated. They have defeated again 13  km (8  mi) east of Rome. Livy wrote the "slaughter was total: their camp was captured and not even the messenger survived to report the disaster".

Account of Diodorus Siculus
In the account of Diodorus Siculus, which is much less detailed, the Senones spent the first day after the battle by the Allia cutting off the heads of the dead, which he claimed was their custom, and then encamped by the city for two days. Meanwhile, the despairing inhabitants of Rome thought that the whole army had been wiped out and that there was no chance of resistance. Many of them fled to other towns. The leaders of the city ordered food, gold, silver and other possessions to be taken to Capitoline Hill, which was then fortified. The Senones thought that the noise in the city meant that a trap was being prepared. However, on the fourth day, they broke down the city gates and pillaged the city. They made daily attacks on the Capitoline but did not hurt any civilians. They suffered many casualties. Finding that they could not take it by force, they decided to lay siege.

Meanwhile, the Etruscans raided the Roman territory around Veii, capturing prisoners and booty. The Roman soldiers who had fled to Veii ambushed them, put them to flight, seized their camp, regained the booty, and took a large number of weapons. The Romans reconstituted an army, gathered men who had dispersed in the countryside when they fled Rome and then decided to relieve the siege of the Capitoline Hill. Cominius Pontius was sent as a messenger to the Capitoline Hill to tell the besieged about the plan and that the men at Veii were waiting for an opportunity to attack. There is no mention of Camillus in the account of Diodorus Siculus.

Pontius swam across the River Tiber and went up a cliff, which was difficult to climb. After giving his message, he returned to Veii. The Gauls noticed the track left by Pontius and ascended the same cliff. The Roman guards were neglectful of their watch and the Gauls escaped detection. When the geese made a noise, the guards rushed against the attackers. Diodorus called Manlius Capitolinus Marcus Mallius and wrote that he cut off the hand of the first Senone climber with his sword and pushed him down the hill. Since the hill was steep, all enemy soldiers fell and died. Then, the Romans negotiated peace and persuaded the Gauls "upon receipt of one thousand pounds of gold, to leave the city and to withdraw from Roman territory".

Account of Plutarch
Plutarch painted a greater picture of destruction and killings than Livy. The Gauls went to Rome on the third day after the battle, where the gates were open, and the walls were unguarded. They marched through the Colline gate. Brennus had the Capitoline Hill surrounded and went to the Forum. He was surprised to see the men sitting outdoors and remaining quiet without fear when they were approached, "leaning on their staves and gazing into one another's faces". The Gauls hesitated to get close to them and touch them and regarded them as superior beings. However, a Gaul plucked up his courage and stroked the long beard of Papirius Marcus, who hit him hard on the head with his staff. The Gauls then killed all men and sacked and burned the houses for many days. The defenders of Capitoline Hill did not surrender and repulsed an attack. The Gauls killed everyone they captured, including women, children and the elderly. The Gauls entered Rome shortly after the Ides of July and withdrew from the city about the Ides of February (February 13), the siege lasting seven months.

Plutarch also notes that some Gauls reached Ardea and that Camillus rallied the city against them and attacked them. On hearing the news, the neighbouring cities called to arms the men of military age, especially the Romans who had fled to Veii. They wanted Camillus to be their commander but refused to do so before he was legally elected. Plutarch then relayed the story of Pontius Cominius and his mission to Capitoline Hill. Camillus could not cross the bridge over the Tiber because the Gauls were guarding it and so he swam across supported by pieces of cork and went to the Carmental Gate. When he reached the top of the Capitoline, the Senate appointed Camillus as dictator. Camillus gathered soldiers from the allies and went to Veii, where there were 20,000 soldiers.

After the episode of the geese of Juno, the Gauls were less hopeful. They were short of provisions but did not go foraging because they feared Camillus. They were also affected by the disease because they were encamped amid ruins, and there were dead bodies scattered everywhere. The wind scattered ash, which made breathing difficult. They were also suffering from the Mediterranean heat to which they were not accustomed. The Gauls "were now whiling away the seventh month in its siege. For all these reasons the mortality was great in their camp; so many were the dead that they could no longer be buried".

The defenders of the Capitoline, in turn, could not get news from Camillus because the city was closely guarded by the enemy. Famine worsened, and the city became dejected and agreed to pay a ransom.

When Camillus arrived in Rome, he lifted the gold from the scales and said that it was the Roman custom to deliver the city with iron, not gold. He then said that the agreement to pay a ransom had not been made legally since it was made without him, who had been made the legal ruler, and so it was not binding. The Gauls now had to say what they wanted because "he [had] come with legal authority to grant pardon to those who asked it, and to inflict punishment on the guilty, unless they showed repentance". Brennus began a skirmish. The two sides could not fight a battle because no battle array was possible "in the heart of the ruined city". Brennus led his men to their camp and then left the city during the night. At dawn, Camillus caught up with them and routed them "[of] the fugitives, some were at once pursued and cut down, but most of them scattered abroad, only to be fallen upon and slain by the people of the surrounding villages and cities".

News of the Gallic sack reached Greece. Plutarch mentions an inaccurate story by Heracleides Ponticus and that Aristotle wrote about the capture of Rome by the Gauls and said that the saviour of the city was "a certain Lucius", not Camillus.

Assessment of Augustine 
Augustine discusses the causes in De Civitate Dei, part I, book III.

Modern assessment of accounts
The accounts of the battle of the Allia and the sack of Rome were written centuries after the events, and their reliability is questionable. That may also account for the discrepancies between Livy and Diodorus Siculus concerning the sack of the city.

The rescue of the city by Camillus is seen by many modern historians as an addition to the story since he was not mentioned by Diodorus Siculus and Polybius, another ancient Greek historian. Diodorus said that the Gauls were defeated at the Trausian Plain, an unidentified location, by an Etruscan army when they were on the way back from southern Italy. Strabo wrote that they were defeated by Caere (the Etruscan city, allied to Rome, to which the Vestal priestesses had fled) and that the Caerites recovered Rome's ransomed gold. That runs counter to the notion that Camillus stopped the payment of a ransom to the Senones. As has been noted, Plutarch wrote that Aristotle said that Rome was saved by "a certain Lucius". That could be Lucius Albinus, who was said to have given the priestesses a lift to Caere. The role of Caere in the saga of the Gallic sack is unclear, and it may be that it played a more important role than in the Roman tradition.

There is also the question of what the Senones were doing in central Italy. Diodorus Siculus wrote that the Senones were "distressed and eager to move" because they had settled to a place (the ager Gallicus) that was too hot. They armed their younger men and sent them out to seek a territory where they might settle. Therefore, they invaded Etruria, the 30,000 sacked the territory of Clusium. However, Cornell finds that to be unconvincing. Throughout the story, the Senones appear to be a warrior band. There is no mention in any of the accounts of wives and children, who would have been present if the Gauls had been a migrating people in search of land. Cornell thinks that they were mercenaries. A few months after the sack of Rome, Dionysius I of Syracuse, the tyrant of the Greek city of Syracuse, in Sicily, hired Gallic mercenaries for a war in the south of Italy. It may well be that was why the Senones were on their way to the south. The story of their defeat on their way back from the south seems to fit with that hypothesis. It could also be that the Senones went to Clusium because they had been hired by one of two political factions at loggerheads to intervene in political struggles in the city, rather than the romanticised story of Aruns's revenge for his wife.

Roman recovery

Rome under attack

389–366 BC: Worsening of relations with Latin League and Hernici
The Gallic sack was a humiliation for Rome and set in motion a series of wars against nearby peoples. Rome, in conjunction with the Latin League, a coalition of other Latin cities, and the Hernici, had spent much of the 5th century fighting against the Volsci and Aequi, who lived to the south, in response to the latter's attacks on their territory. Immediately after the sack, there were attacks by the Volsci and the Etruscan city-states in southern Etruria. Rome responded aggressively. That led to a breakdown of her alliances with the Latin League and the Hernici and rebellions by several Latin cities. Rome spent the next 32 years fighting the Volsci, the Etruscans and the rebel Latin cities.

In 389 BC, the Volsci took up arms and encamped near the Latin city of Lanuvium. Camillus defeated them and laid "waste all the Volscian countryside, which forced the Volsci to surrender." Livy wrote that with this Rome "acquired undisputed control" of the Pomptine Marshes in the southern part of the Volscian territory. However, the Volsci subsequently continued to fight. Camillus then moved against the Aequi who were preparing for war and defeated them, too. The Etruscans captured the colony of Sutrium in southern Etruria and Camillus repelled them. In 388 BC, the Romans laid waste the territory of the Aequi to weaken them and carried out incursions into the territory of the Etruscan city-state of Tarquinii, capturing and destroying Cortuosa and Cobra. In 386 BC the Volscian of the town of Antium gathered an army which included Hernici and Latin forces near Satricum, not far from Antium. A battle with the Romans was stopped by rain, and the Latins and Hernici then returned home. The Volsci retreated to Satricum, which was taken by storm. In 386 BC, the Etruscans seized Sutrium and Nepet, two Roman colonies in southern Etruria. The Romans asked the Latins and Hernici why they did not provide Rome with soldiers, as they were supposed to, under their alliances. Both replied that it was because of "their constant fear of the Volsci." They also said that their men who had fought with the Volsci had done so of their own volition and not under the orders of their councils. However, it was clear that Rome's aggressive actions had caused them to defect and become hostile. In 385 BC, there was another war with the Volsci, who were supported by the rebelling Latins and Hernici as well as the Roman colony of Circeii and Roman colonists from Velitrae. The force was defeated, and most of the prisoners were Latins and Hernici. The Romans planted a colony with 2000 colonists at Satricum.

In 383 BC, the Latin city of Lanuvium rebelled. The Roman senate decided to found a colony at Nepet in southern Etruria and allot land in the Pomptine Marshes to the Roman poor to gain popular support for a war. An epidemic, however, prevented any war. That prompted the Romans at Velitrae and Circeii to sue for pardon, but they were dissuaded by the rebels, who also encouraged pillaging in Roman territory. The Latin city of Praeneste also became rebellious and attacked the territories of the Latin towns of Tusculum, Gabii, and Labici, which were Roman allies. In 382 BC, the Romans attacked and defeated a rebel force in which men from Praeneste almost outnumbered the force of the Roman colonists, near Levitra. The Romans did not attack the town because they were unsure about their success and did not think it was right to exterminate the Roman colony.

Still, in 382 BC, Rome declared war on Praeneste, which joined the Volsci. The joint force took the Roman colony of Satricum despite strong resistance by the Roman colonists. In 381 BC, the Romans levied four legions and marched on Satricum. There was a fierce battle that the Romans won. There were men from Tusculum among the prisoners. After Tusculum broke its alliance with the Romans, Rome declared war on it. However, when the Romans entered its territory, Tusculum did not fight and was granted peace.

In 380 BC, the Praenestines marched into the territory of Gabii and advanced against Rome's walls at the Colline Gate and encamped near the River Allia, where the Gauls had defeated Rome. The Romans defeated them and marched into the territory of Praeneste, seizing eight towns under its jurisdiction and then Levitra. Finally, they confronted Praeneste, the heart of the rebellion, which surrendered. In 378 BC, the Volsci ravaged the borders of Roman territory. The Romans sent an army to Antium on the coast and another to Electra and the mountains and applied a scorched earth policy. In 377 BC, a joint Latin and Volscian force encamped near Satricum. The Romans levied three armies: one was a reserve legion, one defended the city and the third, the largest, marched on Satricum. The enemy was routed and fled to Antium. A quarrel now broke out between the Initiates and the Latins. The former were inclined to give up, but the latter did not and left. The Initiates surrendered their city and lands. The Latins burned Satricum in revenge. Then, they attacked Tusculum, which was rescued by the Romans.

In 370 BC, the Roman colonists of Velitrae made several incursions into Roman territory and besieged Tusculum, knowing that Rome did not have an army because the plebeian tribunes had paralysed the Roman state. Thereafter, the tribunes allowed the election of heads of state and the levy on an army, which drove the rebels from the Tusculum and laid a protracted siege on Levitra. Livy did not state when it ended, but it must have been in 366 BC. In 367 BC, the rebels arrived in Latium. An ageing Camillus defeated them near the Alban Hills, and most of the rebels then fled to Apulia.

366–358 BC: End of hostilities with Latins and Hernici
In 366, there were reports of defection of the Hernici. In 362, Rome declared war on them. The Romans were ambushed and routed. The consul who led the army died in the battle, and the Hernici surrounded the Roman camp. The Romans sent a relief force and the Hernici were defeated in a tough battle. In 361, the Romans seized Ferentinum, a town of the Hernici. When they were on their way back, the people of the Latin city of Tibur shut the city gates on them. In 360, the Gauls encamped near the River Anio. After some skirmishes, the conflict was resolved by single combat between Titus Manlius and a Gaul, which the former won. The Gauls left, went to Tibur, and allied with it, receiving supplies from the city. Then, the Gauls went on to Campania. In 360 BC the Romans attacked Tibur, prompting the Gauls to return to render aid. They then ravaged the territories of Labici, Tusculum, and Alba Longa. The Romans kept an army at Tusculum and fought the Gauls with another one, not far from Rome's Colline gate. After a tough battle, the Gauls went to Tibur again. The two allies were defeated by the two Roman armies. A third Roman army defeated the Hernici in a major battle. In 359, a small force from Tibur arrived at the walls of Rome, but it was repelled easily. In 358, the Etruscan city of Tarquinii was plundered by Roman territory by Etruria. The Romans levied an army against them and one against the Hernici.

That year, the war with the Latins and Hernici ended. Peace with the Latins was prompted by rumours of a Gallic war. The Latin League renewed the alliance with Rome they had made in 493 (the foedus Cassianum), which had lapsed shortly after the Gallic sack of Rome and the subsequent rebellions by several Latin cities. The Latin League provided Rome with soldiers. Thus, the Gauls were the cause of both the falling out between these two parties after the sack of Rome and their reconciliation in 358. The Gauls went to Praeneste and encamped near Pedum. The Roman commander, Gaius Sulpicius, delayed engaging in battle to wear down an enemy which had no food supplies in unfriendly territory and "whose strength and courage lay wholly in attacking, and languished as soon as there came a slight delay." Eventually, the Gauls provoked a battle, which the Romans won. Another Roman army defeated the Hernici and reduced them to subjection. Meanwhile, a third Roman army was defeated by Tarquinii, which killed 307 captured Roman soldiers as a sacrifice. The city of Falerii had sided with Tarquinii but refused to hand over Roman soldiers who had fled there from the battle. Velitrae and the Volscian city of Privernum devastated the Roman fields with sudden raids.

357–345 BC: Further conflict in region
Although the conflict with the Latin league and the Hernici had ended, there were still troubles with the Volsci, Tibur, and the Etruscans. In 357, Rome ravaged the territory of Privernum and then attacked the city, which surrendered. In 356, a Roman army pushed a force from Tibur into their city and pillaged its fields. Another army was routed by Tarquinii and Falerii. A coalition of Etruscan city-states, led by the two cities, advanced to the salt works. The Romans crossed the River Tiber on rafts and seized the enemy camp by surprise, captured 8000 prisoners, and drove the Etruscans out of the Roman territory. In 354, the Romans seized Empulum which was in the territory of Tibur and ravaged lands that belonged to Tarquinii. In 353, they took Sassula, which also belonged to Tibur and surrendered. They also routed the army of Tarquinii, taking many prisoners. They picked 158 noblemen among them, took them to Rome, scourged them, and beheaded them in revenge for the Romans who had been sacrificed by the Tarquinenses. In 353, the Etruscan city of Caere, which had helped Rome during the Gallic sack of Rome, allied with Tarquinii. The Etruscans pillaged the area near the salt works and took their booty in the territory of Caere. The Volsci attacked Roman territory. Caere sent envoys to Rome to beg forgiveness, claiming that it was some country people who joined the pillaging and that the city had not prepared for war. Rome accepted peace and granted a hundred-year truce. The Romans turned their attention to Falerii. They did not encounter any armies and pillaged the countryside, sparing the towns.

In 350, there were troubles with the Gauls and a Greek fleet. A huge army of Gauls had encamped in Latium. The Romans levied an army of four legions led by a consul and a praetor. They encamped at a height close to the Gallic camp and then defeated them. The Roman consul, who was wounded, did not pursue the fugitives, who fled to the Alban Hills. In 349, the Gauls came down from the hills and ravaged the coastal plain. The Greeks carried out naval attacks on the coast from the mouth of the River Tiber to Antium. The Gauls and the Greeks happened to encounter one another and a battle ensued, and the former then withdrew to their camp and the latter to their ships. The Latin League refused to provide Rome with soldiers. The Romans enlisted men everywhere in their territory, including the countryside, and levied ten legions with 4200 infantry each. One of the two consuls died, and the other consul took sole charge of the war. He left two legions in the city to defend it and shared the command of the other eight with a praetor, who was put in charge of preventing the Greeks from landing. The consul encamped in the Pomptine Marshes. He aimed to prevent the Gauls from obtaining their sustenance through plunder. There was single combat between a Gaul and a Roman, which the latter won. That was followed by a battle, which the Romans won. The Gauls scattered among the Volsci, and some of them went to Etruria and others to Apulia. The consuls then joined the other legions to deal with the Greek fleet. There was no battle, and the Greeks were kept offshore. Eventually, the Greeks ran out of water and left.

In 348 and 347, there was peace. In 346, the Volsci of the city of Antium sent envoys to the cities of the Latins to try to stir up a war. The Romans attacked Satricum, which the Volsci had rebuilt two years earlier. They defeated an army of Initiates and other Volsci, which had been levied in advance, and fled to Satricum. The Romans besieged the town, 4000 of the enemy surrendered, and the victorious army burned down the town. In 345, the Aurunci carried out an unexpected raid. It was feared that it was a joint design with the Latin League. The Romans defeated the Aurunci in a single battle, made a surprise attack on the Volsci, and seized the town of Sora.

Modern evaluations of conflicts
Some modern historians follow Karl Julius Beloch, who dismissed the Roman victories soon after the sack. One reason is that they are not mentioned by the Greek historians Diodorus Siculus and Polybius. The other is the assumption that Rome had been damaged too much to be so successful militarily.

Livy said that the city was burnt and that it then developed a haphazard layout because it was rebuilt hastily. However, Cornell notes that Diodorus Siculus and Polybius made only scarce references to the period. He also disputes the extent of the damage suffered by Rome. He points out that there is no archaeological trace of the damage to the sack. Signs of burning that were thought to be dated to this event have subsequently been dated to the rebellion that had brought down the Roman monarchy more than a century earlier. Cornell thinks that the Senones ransacked the city but were interested only in the booty, left most of the buildings alone, and went after they had been bought off. It was common for the layout of ancient cities to be haphazard. He adds that Rome's recovery was aided by cementing the newly-conquered territory of Veii by granting its inhabitants citizenship without the right to vote and by a strengthening of the alliance with Caere, which had helped Rome during the Gallic sack. After the initial setback and attacks, Rome resumed its expansionism of the late 5th and early 4th centuries.

Rome rebuilds its city walls
A few years after the sack, Rome began to build new city walls using ashlar masonry from a quarry in the territory of Veii. It was a huge undertaking as the wall was 11  km (7  mi) long. The original wall had been built in carpaccio tuff, the local stone, which was of rather poor quality because it is a quite friable stone. The wall was rebuilt with a type of yellow tuff, named Grotta Oscura (after its main quarry), which was of much better quality, in the territory of Veii. Thus, the acquisition of Veii provided Rome with better masonry for construction. However, the new rock was harder and thus more difficult to work.

Fear of Gauls
The Gallic sack led to a long-lasting and profound fear of the Gauls in Rome. In 350 and 349 BC, unspecified Gauls attacked Latium. They were probably marauding raids. On the second occasion, Marcus Valerius Corvus was said to have fought a duel with a Gallic champion. Polybius said that Rome made a peace with the Gauls, who did not return for 30 years. Despite Rome defeating the Senones in the Battle of Sentinum (295) during the Third Samnite War (298-290), popular fear of Gauls persisted. In 228, 216, and 114 fears of Gallic attacks led to the Romans performing human sacrifices by burying alive a pair of Gauls and a pair of Greeks even though human sacrifice was not a Roman custom. Presumably, it was done to avert the danger of another Gallic disaster.

Legend about Brennus
The Historia Regum Britanniae, a medieval work of fiction written c. 1136 by Geoffrey of Monmouth on the legendary kings of Britain, depicts Brennus as leading both Britons and Gauls. He besieges Rome for three days until his brother comes to aid in the invasion. The Romans defend the city for many days and are successful in repelling the invaders. Finally, the two consuls don armour and join the men defending the city. They push the invaders back, but Belinus can reform the lines and stop the attacks. Brennus and Belinus continue forward until the walls are breached and the Britons and Gauls invade the city. According to the story, Brennus stayed in Rome and ruled ruthlessly for the rest of his days.

See also
 Dionysius I of Syracuse

Notes

References 
 Primary sources

 Bibliography

Further reading 

 
 

 Janne Ikäheimo, Jari-Matti Kuusela & Eero Jarva, "View of Buried Under? Re-examining the Topography and Geology of the Allia Battlefield", Arctos, 51 (2017), pp. 89–109

External links
The Roman Army
Allia
Livy book 5, ref 5.38 for the Battle of Allia

390s BC conflicts
4th century BC in the Roman Republic
Allia
Allia
Allia
390 BC
387 BC